Youssef Kamel Mohamed Abou Ouf (23 March 1924 – 7 March 1988) was an Egyptian basketball player. He competed in the 1948 and 1952 Summer Olympics.

References

1924 births
1988 deaths
Basketball players at the 1948 Summer Olympics
Basketball players at the 1952 Summer Olympics
Egyptian men's basketball players
Olympic basketball players of Egypt
1950 FIBA World Championship players